The Scofield Mine disaster was a mining explosion that occurred at the Winter Quarters coal mine on May 1, 1900. The mine was located at  near the town of Scofield, Utah. In terms of life lost, it was the worst mining accident at that point in American history. The explosion is also a key element in the plot of the Carla Kelly novel My Loving Vigil Keeping.

Background 
On May 1, 1900, a dust explosion in the Winter Quarters Mine killed at least 200 men, with some rescuers placing the death toll as high as 246. Some were killed outright by the explosion, but most died of asphyxiation by whitedamp and afterdamp. Death came so quickly that some of the mine workers were found still clutching their tools. It still ranks as one of the worst mining disasters in the United States with a high number of deaths. The death toll is 200 but there was some confusion about this as one of the bodies was not found until August 1900. Other numbers have been suggested, but little or no evidence is available to support these claims.

Cause 
One of the deceased had a watch that had stopped at 10:28 AM. The State Mine Inspector's Report determined that ten 25-pound kegs of black powder detonated in the Number 4 Section. This ignited coal dust which spread throughout Number 4 with explosive force killing the miners, and igniting another 20 scattered kegs of powder. The explosion blew up the fan used to ventilate Number 4. However in Number 1 mine which was connected, the fan continued to run and pulled the remnants of the explosion, including afterdamp (primarily carbon monoxide) into Number 1. When the miners inside Number 1 felt the explosion they tried to escape through the most direct route, which happened to be through Number 4. Unaware of where the explosion originated they walked directly into the poisonous gas, and were overcome and killed. Many workers were too far into the mine to escape.

Aftermath 
Over the next two days many people from the towns of Clear Creek and Scofield worked to remove the bodies and care for the dead and wounded. Most of the bodies from Number 4 were burned and mutilated and had to be placed in sacks whereas those killed by gas were loaded into coal carts by the dozen to be hauled out of the mine. The bodies were taken to the company boarding house to be cleaned up and dressed. They were then taken to the school house, where families anxiously waited to claim their husbands and sons. Many of the dead were laid to rest on May 5, 1900, during two large funerals. Every family in the town of Scofield was affected. The disaster left 107 widows and 268 fatherless children. In order to bury all of the dead, 75 caskets had to be imported from Denver, Colorado, because only 125 caskets could be brought in from Salt Lake City.135 graves were dug at the Scofield cemetery, some of which were widened to hold fathers and sons. Funeral trains with more than 51 coffins carried the remaining miners home.  Sixty-one of the dead were Finnish Americans. The Luoma family lost 6 sons, 2 grandsons and a son-in-law.

At the time, the Winter Quarters Mine explosion was the country's worst mining disaster; it now ranks fifth. President William McKinley sent a wire, expressing  "... my intense sorrow upon learning of the terrible calamity which has occurred at Scofield, and my deep sympathy with the wives, children and friends of the unfortunate victims of the explosion."

The disaster led to a strike the following year and to calls for better safety in coal mines and better treatment of mine workers.

One man, one of six Evans brothers working at the mine that day, went through the Abercarn colliery disaster in Wales in 1878, when 268 miners had been killed. He reported that "the scenes [at Abercarn] were tame compared with [Scofield]." Two of his brothers were killed. They were "professional musicians, and natives of Wales. They have taken prizes at all musical events in this locality." A local writer praised Richard T. Evans as "the sweetest singer in Israel."

The Pleasant Valley Coal Company discontinued its operations in 1928. Other coal mines continue to operate in the area.
In Scofield, Utah, there is now a memorial for those who died.

See also 
 List of coal mining disasters

References

Further reading

External links

Carbon County, Utah
Coal mining disasters in Utah
Historic American Engineering Record in Utah
1900 in Utah
1900 disasters in the United States
1900 mining disasters
May 1900 events